HMS Falkland was a 50-gun fourth-rate ship of the line of the Royal Navy, built by Holland of New Castle, New Hampshire, and purchased by the navy in 1696.

She had the distinction of being the first warship built in what would nearly a century later become the United States of America. She was ordered by the British Admiralty in 1690 and delivered on 2 March 1696. During her career she escorted merchant ships to America, and in 1704 engaged the 36-gun French ship La Seine off the Azores.  Together with  they succeeded in capturing her and renamed her .

She was rebuilt for the first time at Chatham Dockyard in 1702 as a fourth rate of between 46 and 54 guns. Her second rebuilt took place at Deptford, where she was reconstructed according to the 1719 Establishment and relaunched on 28 August 1720. On 8 December 1742 orders were issued for Falkland to be taken to pieces and rebuilt for what was to be the final time at Bursledon, where she was reconstructed according to the 1741 proposals of the 1719 Establishment by Philemon Ewer, and relaunched on 17 March 1744. Falkland was one of the ships dispatched to search for the missing  in 1744, and eventually discovered her likely fate when she stopped to re-provision at Guernsey.

Falkland was transferred to the Victualling Department on 10 August 1768.

Notes

References

Lavery, Brian (2003) The Ship of the Line - Volume 1: The development of the battlefleet 1650-1850. Conway Maritime Press. .

Ships of the line of the Royal Navy